Ronaldinho Gaúcho is a Brazilian celebrity comic strip by Mauricio de Sousa, syndicated by Atlantic Syndication. It features a fictionalised version of the Brazilian footballer of the same name as a child.

The strip was created in 2006, when the 2006 FIFA World Cup was taking place in Germany. It ran at least until 2011.

The comic strip was adapted into an animated television series as Ronaldinho Gaúcho's Team, produced by Italian studio GIG Italy Entertainment, with the coproduction of MSP (Mauricio de Sousa Produções).

References

External links 
 Ronaldinho Gaúcho at GoComics

Monica's Gang
Fictional association football players
Fictional Afro-Brazilian people
Association football comics
Comic strips based on real people
Comics set in Brazil
2006 comics debuts
Child characters in comics
Humor comics
Cultural depictions of association football players
Cultural depictions of Brazilian men
Fictional Brazilian people
Comics characters introduced in 2006
Comics adapted into television series
Comics adapted into animated series